The following is a list of lords of Montpellier:

 William I of Montpellier 26 November 986–1019
 William II of Montpellier 1019–1025
 William III of Montpellier 1025–1058
 William IV of Montpellier 1058–1068
 William V of Montpellier 1090–1121
 William VI of Montpellier 1121–1149
 William VII of Montpellier 1149–c. 1172
 William VIII of Montpellier c. 1172–1202
 William IX of Montpellier 1202–1204
 Marie of Montpellier 1204–1213

 Peter II of Aragon
 James I of Aragon 1213–1276
 James II of Majorca 1276–1311
 Sancho of Majorca 1311–1324
 James III of Majorca 1324–1344

In 1344 James III sold the Lordship of Montpellier to King Philip VI of France: Montpellier became a possession of the crown of France.

References
 Lewis, Archibald. The Guillems of Montpellier: A Sociological Appraisal, 1971.

 
Occitan nobility
Montpellier